Sparganothoides arcuatana is a species of moth of the family Tortricidae. It is found in southern Mexico, where it is known from the Sierra Madre Occidental in Jalisco and the Sierra Madre Oriental in Veracruz and Puebla, ranging south to Oaxaca. The habitat consists of montane areas.

The length of the forewings is 10.3–12.1 mm for males and 11.1–12.5 mm for females. The ground colour of the forewings is brownish copper or brownish yellow to golden yellow, with a scattering of brown scales and spots. The hindwings are greyish white. Adults have been recorded on wing in August and September.

The larvae have been reared on Quercus lobata. They web the edges of the leaves of their host plant.

Etymology
The species name refers to the unusual, arc-shaped crease in the valva in the male genitalia and is derived from Latin arcuatus (meaning bent like a bow).

References

Moths described in 2009
Sparganothoides
Fauna of the Sierra Madre Occidental
Flora of the Sierra Madre de Oaxaca
Flora of the Sierra Madre Oriental
Lepidoptera of Mexico
Endemic insects of Mexico